Rainer Podlesch (born 4 November 1944) is a retired German cyclist who was active between 1966 and 1983. He won a silver medal at the 1968 Summer Olympics in the 4000 m team pursuit. In this event he competed for the West Germany team in the preliminaries, but was replaced in the final due to injury. At the next Olympics he took part in the 100 km team time trial and finished in 20th place.

He also won eight medals at the UCI Motor-paced World Championships in 1971–1983, including two gold medals in 1978 and 1983.

His son Carsten Podlesch was also a prominent rider in motor-paced racing and won two world titles and his brother Karsten Podlesch competed in motor-paced racing as a pacer.

References

External links
 
 

1944 births
Living people
People from Ludwigslust-Parchim
People from Mecklenburg
German male cyclists
Cyclists from Mecklenburg-Western Pomerania
Olympic cyclists of West Germany
Cyclists at the 1968 Summer Olympics
Cyclists at the 1972 Summer Olympics
Olympic silver medalists for West Germany
Medalists at the 1968 Summer Olympics